Ekanath Padmanabhan Unny is an Indian political cartoonist. 

He hails from the Ekanath Family of Elappully, Palakkad. He studied physics at the University in the Indian state of Kerala. 

His first cartoon was published in Shankar's Weekly in 1973. He became a professional cartoonist in 1977 with The Hindu. E. P. Unny has worked with the Sunday Mail, The Economic Times and is now the Chief Political Cartoonist with The Indian Express Group.

He has drawn and written graphic novels in Malayalam and a travel book on Kerala - 'Spices and Souls - A doodler's journey through Kerala'. He is said to have been doing graphic shorts in Malayalam literary journals as early as the 1990s. He has also written Santa and the Scribes: The Making of Fort Kochi, which was published in 2014.

Books

 Spices and Souls
 Business as Usual
 Santa and the Scribes: The Making of Fort Kochi

References

Sources
 Review of Spices and Souls, Frontline magazine

People from Palakkad district
Indian cartoonists
Living people
Year of birth missing (living people)
Indian Express Limited people
Writers from Kerala